Helmut Voggenberger (born 21 April 1943) is an Austrian skier. He competed in the Nordic combined event at the 1968 Winter Olympics.

References

External links
 

1943 births
Living people
Austrian male Nordic combined skiers
Olympic Nordic combined skiers of Austria
Nordic combined skiers at the 1968 Winter Olympics
People from Saalfelden
Sportspeople from Salzburg (state)